{{Infobox settlement
|official_name        = Mu'minobod
|native_name          = Мӯъминобод 
|image_skyline        = 
|imagesize            = 
|image_caption        = 
|image_seal           = 
|map_caption          = Location of Mu'minobod in Tajikistan
|pushpin_map          = Tajikistan
|pushpin_mapsize      = 
|coordinates          = 
|subdivision_type     = Country
|subdivision_name     = 
|subdivision_type1 = Region
|subdivision_name1 = Khatlon
|subdivision_type2 = District
|subdivision_name2 = Mu'minobod
|leader_title         = 
|leader_name          = 
|area_magnitude       = 
|area_total_km2       = 
|area_land_km2        =
|area_water_km2       =
|elevation_m          = 
|population_total     = 14,100
|population_as_of     = 2020
|population_footnotes =
<ref>Population of the Republic of Tajikistan as of 1 January, State Statistical Committee, Dushanbe, 2012 </ref>
|population_density_km2  = auto
|population_density_sq_mi= auto
|population_metro     = 
|website              = 
|footnotes            =
|timezone             = Tajikistan Time
|utc_offset           = +5
|timezone_DST         = Tajikistan Time
|utc_offset_DST       = +5
| postal_code_type    = Post index
| postal_code         = 735365
}}

Mu'minobod, previously known as Muminabad, Leningradskiy or Leningrad  is a settlement in south Tajikistan. It is the administrative capital of the Muminobod District in the eastern part of Khatlon Province, located north-east of the city of Kulob, not far from the Panj River and the international border with Afghanistan. The population of the town is 14,100 (January 2020 estimate).

 Population 
The population of Mu'minobod is yearly estimated by the State Committee of Statistics,

 Infrastructure 
South of Mu'minobod, there is a reservoir, storing water for irrigation. It is released in late summer, beginning of autumn.

 Culture 
 Museum 
The town has a town museum.
 Mosques 

The Grand Mosque is located centrally in a park.

 Sport 
In the Stadium of Mu'minobod, many sporting events are carried out, and holidays are celebrated.
 Memorials and Statues
Various statues and memorials are placed in the city centre, mainly to remember national events and personalities.
 World War II memorial 
The memorial park in remembrance of the heroes of the Second World War features a fountain.

 Goat statue 
The goat statue at the entrance of town was removed in 2018, after residents complained being called to live in "that goat place".

 Somoni statue 
Ismoil Somoni, is remembered by an equestrian statue right in the middle of town.
 Lenin statue 
The head of Lenin rests on a pedestal in front of a building opposite the postal office.

 Constitution memorial 
At the traffic light, where the road to Childuxtaron departs from the one leading to the market, there is a memorial of the Constitution of Tajikistan.

 Transport 
Although there is no official public transport, the town can be reached in 45 minutes by a shared car from Kulob for 10 somoni (2017).

Ahead of a visit by the president, the first traffic light was installed in the middle of town. 

 Tourism 
A scenic place, one hour by car North-West of town, is the Childuxtaron Nature Reserve.

 Services 
There is a post office in town.

 Climate 
Mu'minobod has a hot, dry-summer continental climate (Köppen climate classification Dsa''). The average annual temperature is 9.7 °C (49.5 °F). The warmest month is July with an average temperature of 22.2 °C (72.0 °F) and the coolest month is January with an average temperature of -4.0 °C (24.8 °F). The average annual precipitation is 767.1 mm (30.2") and has an average of 78.3 days with precipitation. The wettest month is March with an average of 137.2 mm (5.4") of precipitation and the driest month is August with an average of 2.5 mm (0.1") of precipitation.

See also
List of cities in Tajikistan

References

Populated places in Khatlon Region